Hareluya II Boy (stylized as HARELUYA II BØY), also known simply as Bøy, is a Japanese manga series written and illustrated by Haruto Umezawa. It is a sequel to Umezawa's Hareluya, serialized in Shueisha's shōnen manga magazine Weekly Shōnen Jump in 1992. Hareluya II Boy was serialized in the same magazine from November 1992 to February 1999, with its chapters collected in 33 tankōbon volumes. A 25-episode anime television series adaptation by Triangle Staff was broadcast on TV Tokyo from April to September 1997. The anime series has been licensed by Sentai Filmworks.

Characters

Media

Manga
Written and illustrated by Haruto Umezawa, the first series, was serialized in Shueisha's Weekly Shōnen Jump from June 15 to August 17, 1992. Shueisha collected the chapters in a single tankōbon volume, released on January 7, 1993. Hareluya II Boy was serialized in the same magazine from November 30, 1992, to February 8, 1999. Shueisha collected its chapters in thirty-three tankōbon volumes, released from May 1, 1993, to April 7, 1999.

Anime
A twenty-five episodes anime television series by Triangle Staff was broadcast on TV Tokyo from April 8 to September 30, 1997.

In November 2021, Sentai Filmworks announced that they had licensed the series. It is set to be streamed worldwide in select digital outlets and it will be also released on home video.

References

Further reading

External links

Comedy anime and manga
Sentai Filmworks
Shōnen manga
Shueisha manga
TV Tokyo original programming
Yankī anime and manga